Mirela "Mimi" Rahneva (born July 26, 1988) is a Canadian skeleton racer. Her family immigrated to Canada in 1997; her father, Stoyan, was a competitive gymnast, and her mother was an elite sprinter.  After playing rugby in high school and at the University of Guelph, she began competing in skeleton in 2012 and was selected to the Canadian national team in 2016.  She is coached by Quin Sekulich and rides a Bromley sled. She was named one of the three women to represent Canada in skeleton at the 2018 Winter Olympics in Pyeongchang after earning eighth on the World Cup season standings for 2017–18.

In January 2022, Rahneva was named to Canada's 2022 Olympic team.

Notable results
Rahneva's best finish on the World Cup circuit was at St. Moritz in January 2017, her first season on the World Cup, which she won by a remarkable 1.83 seconds. Prior to entering top-level competition, she won the overall North American Cup for 2015.  She finished in eighth place at the IBSF World Championships 2017 in Königssee, and was part of a team that finished ninth at the combined bobsleigh-skeleton team competition at the same championships.

References

External links

1988 births
Living people
Canadian female skeleton racers
Sportspeople from Ruse, Bulgaria
University of Guelph alumni
Skeleton racers at the 2018 Winter Olympics
Skeleton racers at the 2022 Winter Olympics
Olympic skeleton racers of Canada
Canadian people of Bulgarian descent
Bulgarian emigrants to Canada
20th-century Canadian women
21st-century Canadian women